The 1976–77 Serie A season was won by Juventus.

Teams
Genoa, Catanzaro and Foggia had been promoted from Serie B.

Final classification

Results

Top goalscorers

References and sources
Almanacco Illustrato del Calcio - La Storia 1898-2004, Panini Edizioni, Modena, September 2005

External links
  - All results on RSSSF Website.

1976-77
Italy
1